Bayou Township is a township in Baxter County, Arkansas, United States. Its total population was 360 as of the 2010 United States Census, a decrease of 11.76 percent from 408 at the 2000 census.

According to the 2010 Census, Bayou Township is located at  (36.467714, -92.209491).

References

External links 

Townships in Arkansas
Populated places in Baxter County, Arkansas
Arkansas placenames of Native American origin